Astragalus newberryi (Newberry's milkvetch), is a flowering plant in the family Fabaceae, native to the western United States from Idaho to New Mexico and California. A variety is found in the Death Valley area and the eastern Mojave Desert in California and Nevada. It grows in rocky and gravelly areas between   elevation.

Description
It is a perennial herbaceous plant, with pinnate leaves 1.5–15 cm long with 3–15 leaflets, each leaflet 5–20 mm long. The flowers are pink-purple in color; flowering is between April and June. The fruit is a pod 13–28 mm long, containing a single seed.

References
Stewart, J. M. (1998) Mojave Desert Wildflowers pg. 139.

External links
Jepson Flora Project - Astragalus newberryi
USDA Plants Profile: Astragalus newberryi

newberryi
Flora of the Western United States
Flora of Idaho
Flora of New Mexico
Flora of the Great Basin
Flora of the California desert regions
North American desert flora
Flora without expected TNC conservation status